Streetcars in St. Louis, Missouri operated as part of the transportation network of St. Louis from the middle of the 19th century through the early 1960s. During the first forty years of the streetcar in the city, a variety of private companies operated several dozen lines.  In 1898, the City of St. Louis passed a Central Traction Bill that required franchises for streetcar companies.  United Railways quickly consolidated most St. Louis streetcar companies.  Only St. Louis Suburban remained independent.  It was acquired by United Railways in 1906.  United Railways sank into receivership which was resolved only in 1924.  It was reorganized as St. Louis Public Service Company in 1927, and became Bi-State in 1963.  St. Louis Public Service Company served both the city of St. Louis and neighboring St. Louis County, Missouri. Other private companies, such as those serving the Metro East region or St. Charles, Missouri, continued separate operations. Starting in the 1930s and continuing through the 1960s, St. Louis Public Service ended all streetcar service, while other regional operators also ended their services.

Historical streetcar service

Early public transit
By the 1830s, the city of St. Louis had grown in size beyond the ability of many of its residents to walk conveniently throughout the town. In 1838, brief mention is made in historical records of a private horse drawn cab service in the city, followed in 1843 by the beginning of an omnibus service by entrepreneur Erastus Wells in partnership with an investor named Calvin Case. During the late 1840s, other horse-drawn omnibus service companies began operation, but by the end of 1850, most of these companies had consolidated with the Case and Wells lines to form Case and Company, which operated 90 carriages and several lines in the city. In 1855, principal investor Case was killed in the Gasconade Bridge train disaster, and the company was divided among its other investors. The resulting horse-drawn omnibus lines became the blueprint for horse-drawn street railway service in the late 1850s.

Initial street railways

In December 1855, a group of investors formed the Laclede Railway Company for the purpose of building a street railway, modeled on services then provided in eastern cities such as New York City, Philadelphia, and Boston. However, the Laclede line was never built. In spite of the early failure, by 1859, seven other lines were proposed; however, only four were completed before the outbreak of the American Civil War. The first of these lines began operation on July 4, 1859, running east to west on Olive Street from 4th to 10th streets. However, early operations were marred by difficulty in securing quality rails, and construction problems caused derailments of the cars. All of the prewar railways used horse power to pull their cars, that is they were Horsecars.

After the Civil War, other lines opened in St. Louis that connected the central city with western areas. In 1874, with the opening of the Eads Bridge, a new line opened connecting the city with East St. Louis, Illinois. The first experiments with mechanical traction for the cars took place immediately after the war in 1865 on Grand Avenue, while a fully operational steam-powered line opened in 1868 as an extension of the Olive Street line. This line, however, was not operationally connected with the rest of the horse-drawn lines, and it used a different track gauge from other lines.

Consolidation

Consolidation of St. Louis street railways began in the 1890s.  St. Louis & Suburban was created in 1890 when a Boston Syndicate bought the Cable & Western Railway, the first cable line (of six) in St. Louis.  

On April 13, 1898, the city of St. Louis passed the Central Traction Bill.  It granted a consolidated company the right to run on other company’s tracks, to acquire other companies, and gave it a 50 year franchise.  This was the era of monopolies.  They were funded by syndicates.  Bribery was alleged.  In St. Louis the company was St. Louis United Railways which operated as St. Louis Traction Company.  Similar United Railways companies were formed in many US cities.  Brown Bros. & Co. of New York City controlled most of the stock.  Most St. Louis streetcar companies including Lindell joined the traction company.  Suburban was one of the last independents.  

Consolidation of streetcars in St. Louis resulted in a major strike that lasted for months in 1900.  Companies were accused of hiring non-union workers.  In May the Houseman line was damaged by a dynamite explosion in Webster Groves.

In 1903, Suburban had 93 miles of track.  An article described their readiness for the St. Louis World’s Fair.  The Kirkwood-Ferguson line and Forest Park line from Brentwood are mentioned.  After the 1904 World’s Fair, rider ship increased.  This was the glory days for streetcars.

In 1905, United Railways was acquired by North American Company which also owned Laclede Gas and Union Electric.  In 1906, Suburban was the only car line not operated by United.  Suburban was acquired by United on December 31, 1906. 

As automobiles became more numerous, rider ship declined.  United Railways stopped making a profit and couldn’t pay the mill fare tax due the city.  On March 9, 1918, the city reached an agreement with United.  The nickel fare would be raised to $0.06, the mill tax would be removed, they would pay 0.5% of gross earnings to the city, and the $2.3MM due the city would be paid out of earnings over 7% of their $60MM assessed value.  The public was outraged (probably at the fare increase).  

A referendum petition cancelling the agreement was prepared, but was stolen by burglars who drilled a safe where it was stored in the Cigarmakers Union office.  United refused to honor the agreement.  A compromise was reached in January, 1919.   The company would pay the back mill tax in 10 annual payments of $250K with interest.  Again the public was outraged.  Mayor Kiel maintained he was elected in 1917 to resolve the United issue.  This time recall petitions were circulated for his removal.

In 1919, United filed for bankruptcy. Richard McCulloch, president of United Railways was to be tried for burglary in the theft of the referendum petitions. The very complex bankruptcy involving numerous bonds was finally settled in 1924.

In 1926, United raised fares from 7 to 8 cts or 15 cts for two rides.  They reorganized again in 1927.  United Railways was taken over by St. Louis Public Service Company at midnight on November 30, 1927.

Decline
In the 1920s streetcars began to be replaced by motor buses as bus operators could route freely over public streets, paying only vehicle and gas taxes, while streetcar operators had fixed routes by the tracks, and had to pay additional property taxes for the infrastructure they placed in the road, however a good transit route doesn't need to change often. The construction of Highway I-70 that cut through downtown St. Louis, threatened and ended service to many street lines. The last St. Louis streetcar route in operation was the 15 Hodiamont line which ceased service on May 21, 1966. Much of the streetcar systems' routes are today's MetroBus and Madison County Transit bus routes.

Numbered Streetcar Lines

For a detailed map of St. Louis streetcar lines in 1943 see–

https://www.google.com/maps/d/viewer?mid=1R2CRyCmm82LlWKfkq5MBJKrep0ckycHQ&hl=en_US&ll=38.62007352293517%2C-90.32840012446515&z=13

The route numbering system of St. Louis streetcars was developed by Public Service Co on June 28, 1929.

#1 Kirkwood-Ferguson

The #1 Kirkwood line going south from Brentwood crossed Deere Creek through the Tuxedo Park section of Webster  and roughly followed Kirkham to Kirkwood.  Going north the route followed E. Linden Ave through Richmond Heights and connected with  #14 University (Clayton) at Clayton Rd. Then north on Central Ave through Clayton turning east at Pershing Ave to Skinker, connecting  to #16 City Line Ferguson.  The south end of #16 is the Maplewood loop at Yale and Manchester.

The #1 Kirkwood line was built by the St. Louis and Kirkwood Railroad, a subsidiary of St. Louis and Suburban Railroad, as the  Brentwood, Clayton, and St. Louis Railroad Co. to connect the Houseman Airline in Brentwood with the University (Clayton) line.  Sometimes known as the Brentwood extension, this line gave access from Clayton to Kirkwood and the Meramec Highlands.  Connections allowed travel as far north as Ferguson.

In September, 1898 the St. Louis and Kirkwood Railroad and Suburban was franchised to build a line south on Central Ave through Clayton.  This was next to track used by the Lindell system for its Clayton and Forest Park Railroad.  In April 1899 the St. Louis and Kirkwood Railroad Co transferred its franchise for a cross county line to the Brentwood, Clayton, and St. Louis Railroad Co.  By July, the route was being surveyed. Cars began running in June, 1900.

In 1902, St. Louis County listed the assessments of St. Louis and Suburban lines as:  St. Louis and Kirkwood 12.47 mi, $9000/mi; St. Louis and Meramec 13.44 mi  $12500/mi; Brentwood, Clayton and St. Louis 12.29 mi, $9000/mi.  Assessed for the first time: Brentwood, Clayton and St. Louis, $110,000.

In 1947, Public Service requested permission to replace streetcars with buses. The Kirkwood line ended August 2, 1950.

#53, 54, 55, 56 Manchester lines

In 1895, a second route to Kirkwood began operations.  It ran south on Sarah St from the Olive Street line to Manchester Rd, west to Sutton and the Sutton Loop.  From there is took a southerly route west on Flora, south on Summit, west on Lockwood running into Adams.  To reach Webster the route crossed Edgebrook trestle over the Missouri Pacific tracks and Deere Creek.  Young describes it as “one of the most substantial pieces of trolley engineering in North America.”  The Manchester routes were sometimes called Meramec lines and initially was called the Howard line.  They too joined the Suburban system letting Suburban dominate streetcar service to Kirkwood.  The powerhouse in Brentwood also supplied power to the Meramec Highland Division (#55 & 56).

The Manchester routes converted to buses on April 2, 1949.

#57 Brentwood

Less well known is #57 Brentwood line.  It began near where Brentwood Blvd crosses the Missouri Pacific tracks and ran northeast crossing Hanley Rd just north of Manchester and then through Maplewood and Richmond Heights on Lindbergh Dr. to the loop on Dale Ave a few blocks east of Big Bend at Murphy and Hawthorne (now mostly under Highway 40).  The loop was the west end of #51 Forest Park, which ran east on Oakland, north on Euclid and then downtown on Laclede.

The Brentwood line was built as the St. Louis and Kirkwood Railway.  James Houseman was the major investor.  The line was known as the Houseman Airline.  The Forest Park connection was an extension of the Lindell line’s Chouteau Division.  From Forest Park at the city limit it ran to the Dale Avenue loop over Wise Ave south of St. Mary’s Hospital.  

Lindell was closely involved in the construction of the line.  George W. Baumhoff, a Lindell executive, acted as General Contractor to build the Brentwood line. Lindell also loaned cars for use on the Airline before its cars were ready.  Surveying was begun in 1892. Lindell and Houseman ran an excursion train on the new line on February 2, 1896 from 3rd and Washington in downtown St. Louis to Kirkwood and then Meramec Highlands and back.  August A. Busch was one of the guests.  The trip included a stop at the new Brentwood powerhouse near the Missouri Pacific tracks and Brentwood Blvd in Brentwood.

On March 8, the Houseman Airline had a disastrous head-on when two streetcars collided on their single track line killing three.  Ignoring orders, the motorman of the west bound car raced past a siding thinking he could beat the opposing car to the next siding.  Lawsuits from the accident forced St. Louis and Kirkwood Electric Railway into receivership. 

In May 1896, JD Houseman leased the line from its creditors.  He promised to double track the line and to add more cars. The Houseman Airline was acquired by Suburban in May 1897. A photo of the Brentwood line taken from the Terminal Railroad overpass shows that section was still single track in 1947. According to Young, the Brentwood to Kirkwood section was double tracked in 1905.  A 1947 photo of Brentwood junction shows both lines doubled.

In 1947, Public Service requested permission to replace streetcars on five lines with buses.  The Brentwood line was mentioned specifically.  Bus service began January 30, 1949.  The route was Forest Park Streetcar Loop on Dale west to Big Bend, south to Folk, west to Laclede Station, south to Manchester, west to High School Drive, north to Litzsinger, east to Brentwood, south to Manchester then return over the same route.

Streetcar builders
The St. Louis Car Company began operation in 1887 when financier J.H. Kobush and plant supervisor Peter Kling abandoned the German immigrant industrialist Frederick Brownell's streetcar manufacturing company.  The company lasted until 1973, was located at 3023 North Broadway, and took orders from across the country. The St. Louis Car Company became the biggest streetcar builder in the world. They distributed their cars internationally at their height.

Historical lines or companies
 Baden and St. Louis Railroad
 Benton and Bellefontaine Railroad
 Citizens Railway
 Cass Avenue and Fairgrounds Railroad
 Forest Park and Clayton Railroad
 Lindell Railroad
 Midland Street Railway
 Missouri Railroad
 Northern Central Railroad
 Peoples Railway Company
 St. Louis and Kirkwood Railway
 St. Louis and Suburban Railway
 St. Louis Railroad
 St. Louis, St. Charles and Western Railway
 St. Louis Public Service Company
 Southern Electric Railway
 Tower Grove and Lafayette Railway Company
 Union Railroad
 Union Depot Railroad
 Belleville Electric Railway Company
 East St. Louis and Suburban Railway Company
 East St. Louis Railway Company
 Illinois Traction Company
 Alton, Jacksonville and Peoria Railway Company
 East St. Louis, Columbia and Waterloo Railway Company

These cars serviced 70 Grand, 20 Cherokee, 22 Jefferson, 40 Broadway, 13 Union, 03 Midland, 01 Kirkwood/Ferguson, 10 Delmar, 15 Hodiamont, 42 Sarah, 53 Chouteau, 32 Wellston, 31 Natural Bridge, 05 Creve Coeur Lake, 53/54/55/56 Manchester, 12 Maryland/Olive, 11 University, 14 University Clayton, 66 St. Peters, 65 Woodson, 67 Bridgeton and 51 Forest Park. St. Louis Public Service sold 1700 series to the San Francisco Municipal Railway in 1957. Their numbers were changed to the 1100 series and ran until their retirement in 1982.

Fleets

St. Louis ran Peter Witt Streetcars from 1927 to 1951. All of St. Louis's 3 series of Peter Witt cars were built in the United Railways and Electric Company of St. Louis (founded in 1900 and operator until 1924, it was the predecessor to St. Louis Public Service Company) 39th St shops. Later art-deco PCC (Presidents Conference Committee) cars were first produced in 1936. They were 46 feet long and 9 feet wide. They sat 53 passengers. The St. Louis Car Company built many of these models.  St. Louis Public Service Company ordered three groups of PCC cars in the 1500, 1600 and 1700 Series from them. The first group was delivered in 1940; the last group was delivered in 1946.

Revival
There are three current projects for streetcars in St. Louis.

Delmar Loop Trolley

The Loop Trolley is a  heritage trolley line under construction, which will serve the Delmar Loop district in St. Louis and University City, Missouri. Projected to open in spring 2017, by early October it was reported that late November looked to be the earliest the line might be ready to open. The line will have 10 stations and serve the Missouri History Museum in Forest Park, Washington University in St. Louis, two MetroLink stations (Forest Park-DeBaliviere station and Delmar Loop station), University City City Hall, and all the Delmar Loop attractions. It began service on November 16, 2018, after delays, and ended operations on December 29, 2019, due to lack of funds caused by significantly lower than expected ridership. The line is scheduled to reopen for service on August 4, 2022, now with (Metro Transit) as its  operator.

Origin
The Delmar Loop got its name from a loop of track on the 10 Delmar Streetcar line, which ran its last trip on April 19, 1964. In the early 20th century, the Loop was adjacent to the Delmar Gardens Amusement Park. Until its abandonment on July 25, 1950, the loop was also the terminus of the 05 Creve Coeur Lake line famous for its open "moonlight" cars. The Loop long retained its name, and found a champion in Joe Edwards, the owner of Blueberry Hill, The Pageant, and a number of other Loop businesses. Edwards secured the purchase of two restored Peter Witt-type streetcars that once operated in Milan, Italy, and has led the initiative for the new line in conjunction with Citizens for Modern Transit. The project was cancelled in 2012.

Fleet
The two Peter Witt cars were refurbished by the Gomaco Trolley Company in 2005 and placed on long-term display along the route—one on Delmar by Commerce Bank, and the other at the History Museum.  Plans to restore them to operating condition and also modify them to meet ADA regulations were dropped in 2015 after the needed work was determined to be cost-prohibitive and after substitute cars were found and acquired.  The Loop Trolley line will instead be served by a fleet of three other vintage or vintage-style streetcars.  The first two, which entered service when the line opened in 2018, are two 1991/92 Gomaco-built replicas of 1903 Brill streetcars which the Loop Trolley Transportation Development District acquired from Portland, Oregon, where they had been used on the Portland Vintage Trolley service until 2014.  The third, not expected to be ready for use until some months after the line opens, is a 1928-built ex-Melbourne trolley (No. 512), one of three such cars Loop Trolley TDD has purchased from King County Metro in Seattle, where they had been used on that city's Waterfront Streetcar line from 1982 to 2005; only one of the Seattle cars is being rebuilt for use on the Loop Trolley initially.  Although the Portland and Seattle cars were in much better condition than the Peter Witt cars, they also needed modifications to make them ADA-compatible, primarily the installation of wheelchair lifts, and Gomaco was awarded contracts to carry out that work, along with other modifications to the three cars.

St. Charles City Streetcar

Nine original 1700 series PCC streetcars were purchased for use in the proposed New Town at St. Charles developed by Whittaker Builders Inc. Some would have been placed around town converted into old-fashioned diners, cafés, or bookstores while others would have been restored and put back in service. The proposed route was to run  from New Town to St. Charles, Missouri.

The project was doomed when Whittaker Brothers filed for bankruptcy. The streetcars were scrapped after a fire in 2012.

St. Louis Streetcar

In June 2013 Forbes magazine profiled new streetcar systems of ten USA cities that had built or were building new modern streetcar systems.
According to Forbes St. Louis is planning to build a  modern system to connect Downtown St. Louis to the Central West End along with other neighborhoods like Downtown West, Midtown, and Carr Square. It does not connect to the Delmar Loop Trolley.

See also
List of streetcar systems in the United States
Streetcar strikes in the United States
Streetcars in North America
Robert Guillaume - actor worked as St. Louis streetcar motorman and first African American to do so.

References

External links
Western Rail Images Website
KETC Living St. Louis Streetcar Memories a short video about streetcars in St. Louis, with various 20th-century footage assembled by local PBS station KETC

Light rail in Missouri